Bolsheviks were a faction of the Russian Social-Democratic Labor Party which eventually took power in Russia.

Bolshevik or Bolsheviks may also refer to:

Places
 Bolshevik (inhabited locality), several inhabited localities in Russia
 Bolshevik, former name of St. Anastasia Island in the Black Sea
 Bolshevik Island, the southernmost island of the Severnaya Zemlya group

Other
 Bolshevik (journal), monthly theoretical magazine of the Communist Party of the Soviet Union
 Bolshevik Factory, name of the Obukhov State Plant between 1922 and 1992
 The Bolsheviks, a professional wrestling tag team